Without a Woman (Italian: Senza una donna) is a 1943 Italian "white-telephones" comedy film directed by Alfredo Guarini and starring Giuseppe Lugo,  Silvana Jachino and Umberto Melnati.

The art directors Piero Filippone and Mario Rappini worked on the film's sets. It was shot at Cinecittà in Rome and the Fert Studios of Turin. Location filming took place around Pieve Ligure near Genoa.

Synopsis
A misogynistic Duke shuts himself up in a castle along with several other men. However their peace is disturbed by the arrival of some stranded female dancers who have missed their train.

Cast
 Giuseppe Lugo as Il principe Giannettini detto Giorgio Del Manto  
 Silvana Jachino as Marta  
 Umberto Melnati as Il duca Venanzio Navarra  
 Carlo Campanini as Michelino Panigatti  
 Guglielmo Barnabò as Adalgiso Barni Vagnoli  
 Jone Morino as Donna Gloria  
 Jone Salinas as Valeria  
 Maria Dominiani as Maria  
 Doretta Sestan as Stefania  
 Guglielmo Sinaz as L'impresario Pappalardo  
 Franco Coop as Oreste Tromba  
 Arturo Bragaglia as Il legale del duca 
 Anna Arena as Anna  
 Bacot as Il cameriere custode del castello  
 Vittorina Benvenuti as Bettina, la sorella del duca  
 Gino Bianchi as Marchi  
 Luigi Erminio D'Olivo as L'accompagnatore della signora Tromba  
 Pina Gallini as Stella  
 Lydia Johnson as La signora Tromba  
 Alfredo Martinelli as Un testimone  
 Edda Soligo as La segretaria dell'istituto di bellezza

References

Bibliography 
 Roberto Chiti & Enrico Lancia. Dizionario del cinema italiano: I film. Gremese Editore, 2005.

External links 
 

1943 films
Italian comedy films
1943 comedy films
1940s Italian-language films
Films directed by Alfredo Guarini
Films shot at Cinecittà Studios
Italian black-and-white films
Minerva Film films
1940s Italian films